is a Japanese actress represented by Amuse.

Career 
In 2011 Yamada won the Grand Prix at Ciao Girl 2011 Audition, and joined the talent agency Amuse Inc. She attended the audition because she wanted the Nintendo 3DS, which was the prize of the Grand Prix. Since then, she has been active as a model for the magazine Ciao.

In 2013 she played the role of Emi Natsume in Keiji no Manazashi, which was broadcast on TBS, and made her first appearance in a TV drama. In the comic JS・JC Moderu Monogatari published in the same year, the story of how she became active as a Ciao Girl was written by Mea Sakisaka and published under the title of Fairy Smile ~ Anna Yamada Monogatari ~.

In 2015, Yamada starred as Yui in the live-action drama of Nao Maita's original manga Age 12.

She made her first appearance in the movie Too Young to Die! released in 2016.

In the January 23, 2017 issue of Weekly Playboy, released in 2017, she was featured as one of the eight "Sugokawa 2017".

She starred in the movie Misumisou, released in 2018. The same year, she starred in the TV drama Sachiiro no One Room.

She released her first photo book in 2019. The same year, she won the Best Newcomer Award at the 41st Yokohama Film Festival for her performance in her movie Chiisana Koi no Uta.

In 2020, she participated in the #SaveWithStories project by Save the Children by storytelling the picture book Tebukuro wo Kaini. In December of the same year, she released her first calendar.

In 2021, she ranked 3rd in the Next Break Female Talent BEST 10 by Talent Power Ranking. In March of the same year, she participated in the photo exhibition Vol.3 of Watashi no Toritakatta Joyū-ten under the nomination of photographer Takahiro Sakai.

Filmography

Movies

Television drama

Originals 
 Age 12 (September and December 2015) as Yui Aoi

Awards

References

External links

Japanese child actresses
Japanese television actresses
Japanese film actresses
Amuse Inc. talents
2001 births
21st-century Japanese actresses
Living people